Svetoslav Tchanliev Kirilov (Bulgarian: Светослав Чанлиев; born 3 August 1973) is a Bulgarian former road cyclist. He most notably won the 2005 Tour of Turkey. He has one daughter, named Stella Svetoslav Chanlieva, born in 2001.

Major results

2000
 3rd Time trial, National Road Championships
2002
 1st Stage 7 Tour of Turkey
2003
 1st Stage 4 Tour of Turkey
 2nd Overall International Tour of Hellas
1st Stage 3
 National Road Championships
3rd Road race
3rd Time trial
 8th Overall Paths of King Nikola
2004
 1st Stage 5 Tour de Serbie
 2nd Road race, National Road Championships
 2nd Sacrifice Cup
 4th Overall Grand Prix Sunny Beach
2005
 1st  Overall Tour of Turkey
1st Stages 2,3 & 5
 3rd Overall Grand Prix Sunny Beach
1st Stage 2
 3rd Road race, National Road Championships
 9th Overall Paths of King Nikola
2006
 1st Stage 4 Tour d'Egypte
2007
 2nd Overall International Paths of Victory Tour
1st Stage 1
 8th Overall Tour of Turkey
2008
 3rd Road race, National Road Championships
 3rd Overall Tour of Szeklerland
 3rd Overall Romanian Cycling Tour
 5th Overall Tour of Bulgaria
 7th Grand Prix Bourgas
 9th Overall Tour d'Egypte
1st Stage 6
 10th Overall Tour of Azerbaijan (Iran)
2009
 5th Tour of Vojvodina II
2010
 4th Road race, National Road Championships
 10th Overall Tour of Victory
2011
 3rd Overall Tour of Bulgaria
 9th Overall Tour of Trakya

References

External links

1973 births
Living people
Bulgarian male cyclists